The Meekatharra to Wiluna railway was a  branch line of the Western Australian Government Railways that extended the Mullewa – Meekatharra railway from Meekatharra to Wiluna. Wiluna was the furthest rail terminus from Perth on the Western Australian Government Railways system.

Overview 
Construction began in the late 1920s, and the line operated between 1932 and 1957, mainly serving the Wiluna gold mining area.

However Wiluna was also at the end of the  Canning Stock Route from Halls Creek in the Kimberley region of Western Australia, and so the railway became a vital means of dispatching cattle intended for southern markets.

The track was susceptible to washaways.

Intermediate stopping points 
 Meekatharra -  from Perth
 Gnaweeda - 
 Richardson - 
 Yaganoo - 
 Paroo – 
 Wiluna - ~

Closure  
The two sections - Meekathara to Paroo (107.7 km) and Paroo to Wiluna (68.3 km) were closed on 5 August 1957.

References 

Closed railway lines in Western Australia
Mid West (Western Australia)
Railway lines opened in 1932
Railway lines closed in 1957